The  is an electric multiple unit (EMU) train type for express services on the Chichibu Main Line operated by the private railway operator Chichibu Railway in Japan since 2006.

Formation
The three three-car sets are formed as shown below, with two motored ("M") cars and one non-powered trailer ("T") car.

The DeHa 6100 car is fitted with two lozenge-type pantographs.

History
Three 3-car trains were converted from 2005 from former Seibu 101 series 4-car EMUs. Conversion involved sealing the centre pair of side doors and installing transverse seating displaced from Seibu 10000 series limited express EMUs when they were refurbished. The seats are arranged in facing bays, and no longer rotate.

Special liveries

In October 2014, set 6003 was repainted in a revival beige and brown livery based on that carried by the former 300 series trains.

References

Electric multiple units of Japan
Train-related introductions in 2006
Chichibu Railway
1500 V DC multiple units of Japan